Ann Marie Wisdom (1934 - 2015) was a female rally driver, better known as a navigator.

Career
During the late 1950s and early 1960s, she was well known as a navigator for Pat Moss, the sister of Sir Stirling Moss. Their partnership ensured them to compete at the same level as the men. In 1962, she ended her rally career in order to start a family, marrying the gentleman rally driver, Peter Riley. Pat bounced back, hiring erstwhile driver Pauline Mayman to navigate.

Personal life
Ann was the daughter and only child of professional racers Tommy Wisdom and Elsie Wisdom (née Gleed).

In 1962, shortly after retiring, she married rally driver Peter Riley in Worthing and remained married until her death on October 14, 2015, exactly seven years after the death of Pat Moss. Peter died just under a year later, in July 2016.

During their marriage, Ann and Peter had two children, Tim and Jenny.

References

External links
 eWRC

Female rally drivers
English rally drivers
1934 births
2015 deaths
English female racing drivers